The 2017 Camping World Bowl was a post-season American college football bowl game played on December 28, 2017, at the Camping World Stadium in Orlando, Florida. The 28th edition of the Camping World Bowl featured the Virginia Tech Hokies of the Atlantic Coast Conference against the Oklahoma State Cowboys of the Big 12 Conference. It was one of the 2017–18 bowl games concluding the 2017 FBS football season.  The game's naming rights sponsor was the Camping World recreational vehicle company.

Teams
The game featured tie-ins from the Atlantic Coast Conference and the Big 12 Conference.

Virginia Tech Hokies

Oklahoma State Cowboys

Game summary

Scoring summary

Statistics

References

Camping World Bowl
Cheez-It Bowl
Oklahoma State Cowboys football bowl games
Virginia Tech Hokies football bowl games
Camping World Bowl
Camping World Bowl
2010s in Orlando, Florida